The 1968 Wightman Cup was the 40th edition of the annual women's team tennis competition between the United States and Great Britain. It was held at the All England Lawn Tennis and Croquet Club in London, England, United Kingdom.

References

1968
1968 in tennis
1968 in women's tennis
1968 in American tennis
1968 in British sport
1968 sports events in London
1968 in English tennis
1968 in English women's sport